Salimicrobium luteum is a bacterium from the genus of Salimicrobium.

References

External links
Type strain of Salimicrobium luteum at BacDive -  the Bacterial Diversity Metadatabase

 

Bacillaceae
Bacteria described in 2007